Ernest Edward Ranier (1908-1994) was an Australian rugby league footballer who played in the 1930s and 1940s.

Playing career
London born, Ern Ranier arrived in Australia as a three-year-old in 1911 and was brought up in the Newtown area. 

An exciting winger with a great turn of speed, Ern Ranier was graded at Newtown in 1930 and was in the First Grade team a year later. In 1934 he went to Cowra, New South Wales to take up a captain/coach position and in 1935 he was playing for Inverell, New South Wales. 

In 1936 he returned to Sydney and he played two seasons at St. George. In 1938, Ranier joined Eastern Suburbs but failed to make First Grade, and in 1939 he played in the City Houses competition for Dunlop-Perdriau. 

Ranier was selected to play for New South Wales for one representative match in 1932.

Ranier enlisted in the Australian Army in late 1939  and during a brief home fisit in 1942, he turned out for his old team Newtown on one occasion in first grade.

Death
Ranier died on 18 June 1994 in Bondi, New South Wales aged 85.

References

1908 births
1994 deaths
Australian military personnel of World War II
Australian rugby league coaches
Australian rugby league players
New South Wales rugby league team players
Newtown Jets players
Rugby league players from London
Rugby league wingers
St. George Dragons players